The Special Region of Yogyakarta is a provincial-level autonomous region of Indonesia in southern Java.

It is bordered by the Indian Ocean to the south, as well as sharing all the land borders to the province of Central Java. Co-ruled by the Yogyakarta Sultanate and the Duchy of Pakualaman, the region is the only officially recognized diarchy within the government of Indonesia. The city of Yogyakarta is a popular tourist destination and cultural center of the region.
The Yogyakarta Sultanate was established in 1755 and provided unwavering support for Indonesia's independence during the Indonesian National Revolution (1945–1949). As a first-level division in Indonesia, Yogyakarta is governed by Sultan Hamengkubuwono X as the governor and Prince Paku Alam X as the vice governor. With a land area of just 3,185.8 km2, it is the second-smallest province-level entity of Indonesia after Jakarta.

History 

In Javanese, it is pronounced , and named after the city of Ayodhya in Javanese-Hindu mythology. The Dutch name of the Special Region is Djokjakarta.

The Sultanate has existed in various forms through prehistory and survived through the rule of the Dutch and the 1942 invasion of the Dutch East Indies by the Japanese Empire. In August 1945 Indonesia's first president, Sukarno proclaimed the independence of the Indonesian Republic, and by September of that year, Sultan Hamengkubuwono IX and duke Sri Paku Alam VIII had sent letters to Sukarno expressing their support for the newly born nation of Indonesia, in which they acknowledged the Yogyakarta Sultanate as part of the Indonesian Republic. The Sunanate of Surakarta did the same, and both of the Javanese kingdoms were awarded special status as special regions within the Indonesian Republic. However, due to a leftist anti-royalist uprising in Surakarta, the Sunanate of Surakarta lost its special administrative status in 1946 and was absorbed into the province of Central Java.

Yogyakarta's overwhelming support and the Sultan's patriotism were essential in the Indonesian struggle for independence during the Indonesian National Revolution (1945–1949). The city of Yogyakarta became the capital of the Indonesian Republic from January 1946 to December 1948 after the fall of Jakarta to the Dutch. Later, the Dutch also invaded Yogyakarta causing the Indonesian Republic's capital to be transferred again to Bukittinggi in West Sumatra on 19 December 1948. In return for Yogyakarta's support, the declaration of Special Authority over Yogyakarta was granted in full in 1950 and Yogyakarta was given the status as a Special Administrative Region, making Yogyakarta the only region headed by a monarchy in Indonesia. 

The Special Region was struck by a 6.3-magnitude earthquake on 27 May 2006, killing 5,782 people, injuring approximately 36,000 and leaving 600,000 people homeless. The region of Bantul suffered the most damage and deaths.

Geography 

The Special Region is located near the southern coast of Java, surrounded on three sides by the province of Central Java, and with the Indian Ocean on the south side. The population at the 2010 Census was 3,457,491 people, and then increased to 3,668,719 at the 2020 Census; the official estimate for mid 2021 was 3,712,896. It has an area of 3,133.15 km2, making it the second-smallest area of the provinces in Indonesia, after the Jakarta Capital Region. Along with surrounding areas in Central Java, it has some of the highest population densities of Java.

Mount Merapi is located to the immediate north of the city of Yogyakarta and Sleman Regency.  It is the most active volcano in Indonesia and has erupted regularly since 1548.  It last erupted in October–November 2010, killing and injuring many people and temporarily displacing approximately 100,000 residents.

Geo-heritage sites 

Indonesia has a number of geo-heritage sites in the Yogyakarta Special Region. It has been declared by the Geological Agency of the Ministry of Energy and Mineral Resources. The sites consist of 9 sites:
Eocene limestone in Gamping (Sleman Regency), pillow lava in Berbah (Sleman), pre-historic volcanic sediment in Candi Ijo, Prambanan (Sleman), sand dunes in Parangtritis Beach (Bantul regency), Kiskendo cave, and former manganese mining site in Kleripan (Kulonprogo regency), the prehistoric volcano in Nglanggeran (Gunungkidul regency), Wediombo-Siung beaches (Gunungkidul) and Bioturbasi site in Kalingalang (Gunungkidul). The most unusual one is pillow lava in Berbah (Sleman) which is a big, rough black rock that lies on the bank of the narrow Dengkeng River. The prehistoric volcano in Nglanggeran (Gunungkidul regency) has already been developed as a tourist destination.

Government and politics

Governor 

According to Act No. 22 of 1948 (which is also the basis of Act No. 3 of 1950 on the formation of DIY), the Head and Vice Head of the Special Region are appointed by the President from the descendants of the ruling family in the region prior to Indonesian independence with the conditions of "skill, honesty, and loyalty, and keeping in mind the customs of the area." Thus, the Head of the Special Region, until 1988, was automatically held by the reigning Sultan of Yogyakarta, and the Vice Head of the Special Region, until 1998, was automatically held by Prince Paku Alam who was on the throne. The nomenclature of the Governor and Vice Governor of the Special Region has only been used since 1999 with the issuance of Act No. 22 of 1999. Since 2012, the mechanism for filling the positions of Governor and Vice Governor of DIY is regulated by Act No. 13 of 2012 on the Uniqueness of the Special Region of Yogyakarta.

Administrative divisions 

The Special Region of Yogyakarta (provincial level) is subdivided into four regencies (kabupaten) and one city (kota):

Located within the Special Region of Yogyakarta, the city of Yogyakarta is known as a center of classical Javanese fine art and culture such as batik, ballet, drama, music, poetry, and puppet shows. It is also one of Indonesia's most renowned centers of higher education. At the city's center is the Sultan's palace called the Kraton. While the city sprawls in all directions from the Kraton, the core of the modern city is to the north.

Demographics

Language
Aside from the Indonesian language, the Javanese language is also designated as the official language of the Special Region of Yogyakarta under Yogyakarta Special Region Regulation Number 2 of 2021.

Religion
The majority of the population is Muslim, which is 92.62%, the rest are Catholic Christians 4.50%, then Protestant Christians 2.68%, Buddhists 0.10%, Hindus 0.09% and others 0.01%.

Infrastructure

Transport 
Yogyakarta is served by Adisutjipto International Airport and Yogyakarta International Airport, the latter being opened for minimum operations in late April 2019 and fully operational starting late March 2020. There are two main railway stations: Lempuyangan Station and Yogyakarta railway station.

Yogyakarta is considered one of the major hubs that link the west–east main railway route in Java island. Yogyakarta Station is the main train station located in the center, and Lempuyangan Station is the second train station in the city. The two stations have their own schedule to and from other cities on Java island. The Prambanan Express commuter rail service operates west of Yogyakarta Station across Kulonprogo Regency to Purworejo, and KAI Commuter Yogyakarta Line electric commuter rail system operates from east of the station to Surakarta. To the south, in the Bantul region, is the Giwangan bus station, one of the largest bus station in Indonesia. The Yogyakarta metropolitan center is surrounded by a ring road.

Since 2008, the government of Special Region of Yogyakarta launched a bus rapid transit system, the Trans Jogja, which connects places in and around Yogyakarta City, including the airport and the Prambanan temple. Today, Trans Jogja has reached other points in the south-side of the city.

Education 

Yogyakarta is home to more than 100 institutions of higher education in Indonesia, the highest number of higher education institutions of any province in Indonesia. Hence, Yogyakarta earned its nickname "Kota Pelajar" (The City of Students).

Yogyakarta is the home of the first established state university in Indonesia, the Gadjah Mada University.

The Special Region is also the home of the first-established private university in Indonesia, the Islamic University of Indonesia, which was founded in 1945. The Indonesia Institute of Arts, the first-established university in fine arts, is also in the region. Other large universities include Yogyakarta State University, Sunan Kalijaga State Islamic University, Sanata Dharma University, Muhammadiyah University of Yogyakarta and the University of Atma Jaya Yogyakarta.

Sister relationships 
Yogyakarta Special Region has signed sister province relationship or friendly ties agreement with region/state:

 Kyoto Prefecture, Japan
 State of California, United States
 Gyeongsangbuk-do, South Korea
 Tyrol, Austria
 Chiang Mai Province, Thailand

See also 
List of cities in Indonesia

Notes

References 
 Regional Office of the Department of Tourism, Post and Telecommunication for the Special Region of Yogyakarta. (1997) Guide To Yogyakarta. Yogyakarta: Department of Tourism, Post and Telecommunication.
 Ricklefs, M.C. (2001) A history of modern Indonesia since c.1200 (3rd ed.). Stanford: Stanford University Press. pp. 126–139, 269–271. 
 Ricklefs, M.C. (1974) Jogjakarta under Sultan Mangkubumi, 1749–1792: A history of the division of Java. London Oriental Series, vol. 30. London: Oxford University Press, (Revised Indonesian edition 2002)
 Soemanto, Bakdi (1992) Cerita Rakyat dari Yogyakarta Jakarta: Grasindo (In Indonesian)
 Soemardjan, S. (1962) Social Changes in Yogyakarta, Ithaca, N.Y. Cornell University Press.

External links 
 
 

 
States and territories established in 1950